Little Nellie 007 is a 1991 book by Bruce Barrymore Halpenny about the James Bond autogyro, Little Nellie, as featured in the film You Only Live Twice, and her creator, Wing Commander Retd. Ken Wallis.

The book, known to James Bond fans, and also used as a reference book for other Bond books, gives a behind-the-scenes look at the making of the film, as well as providing all the location shoots for the film, and also a brief history of aviation legend Ken Wallis. Halpenny and Wallis were friends and both ex-Royal Air Force.

The book briefly delves into Ken Wallis’s early family connections with aviation, then onto his own World War II exploits, first as an operational pilot in the Army Co-operation Command flying Lysanders and then as an operational captain of Wellington bombers. Finally, the reader is brought to Wallis’s post-war activities and early stunt filming in Brazil, (some around the statue of Christ by the Corcovado Mountain at Rio de Janeiro and at one point accidentally getting caught in one of Brazil’s notorious "ventana" windstorms) and Italy.

The book then gives the behind the scenes information about Little Nellie, a Wallis WA-116 Agile, and the filming.

The sections include:
Little Nellie;
Little Nellie in Action;
Little Nellie on Location;
Shooting a Ground Scene;
Little Nellie’s Weapons;
Little Nellie is Hit;
The Dangers;
The Most Memorable;
A Punishing Schedule;
The Lighter Moments and No Time to Relax.

See also
 Outline of James Bond

References
Notes

Bibliography
 Little Nellie 007 on Amazon 
 James Bond 007: Aproximación a una saga by Luis Saavedra Castaño — Published by Saimel Ediciones, 2000. Original from the University of Michigan. Digitized February 26, 2008 (229 pages)

1991 non-fiction books
20th-century aviation
Non-fiction books about James Bond
Aviation books
Works by Bruce Barrymore Halpenny
Books about individual films